Dedisse Park is a Denver Mountain Park located in Jefferson County, Colorado, USA. It was originally the scenic mountain ranch of 1860s pioneer Julius C. Dedisse; this  of land was purchased by the City & County of Denver in 1919. Colorado's first mountain golf course, the Evergreen Golf Course, was constructed here in 1925, which features the rustic lodge Keys on the Green restaurant.

See also
National Register of Historic Places listings in Jefferson County, Colorado
Denver Mountain Parks

References

External links

Denver Mountain Parks website
Keys on the Green Restaurant

Denver Mountain Parks
Parks on the National Register of Historic Places in Colorado
Protected areas of Jefferson County, Colorado
National Register of Historic Places in Jefferson County, Colorado
National Park Service rustic in Colorado